Sushi 4004 is an album of various Shibuya-kei artists compiled by Le Hammond Inferno, and released by their indie pop label Bungalow

Track listing
 "Bowlers in Space" – Midnight Bowlers – 7:12
 "You Are My Music" – Hi-Posi – 5:16
 "S'il Vous Plait" – Fantastic Plastic Machine – 5:40
 "2300 Hawaii" – Yoshinori Sunahara – 5:51
 "K2" – Man From Electone – 4:14
 "Alcohol" – Kahimi Karie – 5:51
 "Yukarin' Disco" – Yukari Fresh – 3:26
 "Samba De Sunny Side Up" – Collette – 4:09
 "Lait Au Miel" – Oh! Penelope – 2:55
 "Fantastic Cat" – Takako Minekawa – 3:59
 "Some Kinds Of Love" – DOB – 5:06
 "Hello Baby" – Sweet Robots Against the Machine – 2:59
 "Tragedy Of The Softrocker" – Neil & Iraiza – 2:58
 "Drive Music" – Qypthone – 6:13
 "The Microdisneycal World Tour (Sean O'Hagan Mix)" – Cornelius – 5:58
 "Lesson 3003 (Part 1)" – Pizzicato Five – 6:09

References

1998 compilation albums
Shibuya-kei albums